The 1929 International Lawn Tennis Challenge was the 24th edition of what is now known as the Davis Cup. 24 teams would enter the Europe Zone, while five would enter the America Zone. Egypt and Monaco participated for the first time.

The United States defeated Germany in the Inter-Zonal play-off, but would lose to France in the challenge round, giving France their third straight title. The final was played at Stade Roland Garros in Paris, France on 26–28 July.

America Zone

Draw

Final
United States vs. Cuba

Europe Zone

Draw

Final
Germany vs. Great Britain

Inter-zonal final
Germany vs. United States

Challenge round
France vs. United States

See also
 1929 Wightman Cup

References

External links
Davis Cup official website

Davis Cups by year
 
International Lawn Tennis Challenge
International Lawn Tennis Challenge
International Lawn Tennis Challenge
International Lawn Tennis Challenge